The 22945 / 22946 Mumbai Central–Okha Saurashtra Mail is an Express train belonging to Indian Railways – Western Railway zone that runs between  and  in India.

It operates as train number 22945 from Mumbai Central to Okha and as train number 22946 in the reverse direction, serving the state of Maharashtra & Gujarat.
This train is started on 1 Oct 1925 and was name as Kathiawad Express after which the name is changed to Saurashtra Mail.

Coaches

The 22945 / 46 Mumbai Central–Okha Saurashtra Mail presently has 1 AC 1st Class cum AC 2 tier, 1 AC 2 tier, 5 AC 3 tier, 8 Sleeper class, 4 General Unreserved and 2 EOG (seating cum luggage rake) coaches. It does not have a pantry car.

As is customary with most train services in India, coach composition may be amended at the discretion of Indian Railways depending on demand.

Service

The 22945 Mumbai Central–Okha Saurashtra Mail covers the distance of 990 kilometres in 17 hours 50 mins (55.21 km/hr) & in 17 hours 50 mins as 22946 Okha–Mumbai Central Saurashtra Mail (55.80 km/hr).

As the average speed of the train is above 55 km/hr, as per Indian Railways rules, its fare includes a Mail surcharge.

Routeing

Gallery

Schedule

Traction

Prior to February 2012, dual-traction Valsad-based WCAM-1 locomotives would haul the train between Mumbai Central &  handing over to a Ratlam or Vatva-based WDM-3A locomotive for the remainder of the journey.

Western Railway completed DC electric conversion to AC on 5 February 2012 & it is now regularly hauled by a Vadodara-based WAP-4E / WAP-5 locomotive until Ahmedabad Junction, handing over to a Sabarmati-based WDP-4D locomotive which powers the train for the remainder of the journey.

References

External links

Transport in Okha
Transport in Mumbai
Rail transport in Gujarat
Rail transport in Maharashtra
Mail trains in India
Railway services introduced in 1925